Daviesia pleurophylla is a species of flowering plant in the family Fabaceae and is endemic to a restricted area in the north of Western Australia. It is a large, openly-branched shrub with many ribbed branchlets, scattered, sharply-pointed, needle-shaped phyllodes, and yellow and dark red flowers.

Description

Taxonomy and naming
Daviesia pleurophylla was first formally described in 1995 by Michael Crisp in Australian Systematic Botany from specimens collected by Alex George in the Cape Range in 1970. The specific epithet (pleurophylla) means "rib-leaved".

Distribution and habitat
This daviesia grows in open shrubland on deep sand and is only known from the Cape Range-Exmouth area in the north-west of Western Australia.

Conservation status
Daviesia pleurophylla is listed as "Priority Two" by the Western Australian Government Department of Biodiversity, Conservation and Attractions, meaning that it is poorly known and from only one or a few locations.

References

pleurophylla
Eudicots of Western Australia
Plants described in 1991
Taxa named by Michael Crisp